Kentucky Route 1649 (KY 1649) is a  state highway in Kentucky. KY 1649's western terminus is at KY 70 in Liberty, and the eastern terminus is at KY 837 north of Mintonville

Major intersections

References

1649
Transportation in Casey County, Kentucky